Prometheum pilosum is a succulent plant in the family Crassulaceae. It is native to Asia.

References

Crassulaceae
Flora of Asia
Plants described in 1939